Julius R. Nasso (born October 19, 1952) is an Italian-American film producer, pharmacologist, and businessman.

Personal life
Julius R. Nasso was born in a small village called Terranova, Calabria, Italy.  In 1976, Nasso graduated from St. John's University with a Bachelor of Science degree in pharmacy.  He then earned an advanced Doctor of Pharmacy degree from the University of Connecticut.

On March 14, 2017, Nasso made headlines when two ponies belonging to him escaped from their barn during a snowstorm on Staten Island. The ponies, Blondie and Jewels, were quickly captured and returned to Nasso with the help of an off-duty police officer.

Legal issues
Nasso was involved in a six-year legal battle with his former longtime collaborator Steven Seagal after their business relationship ended in 2000. The two had been "best friends", according to Seagal, and formed Seagal/Nasso Productions together, but their relationship eventually became strained. Believing that Seagal owed him $3 million in compensation for backing out of a four-film deal, Nasso enlisted members of the Gambino crime family to threaten Seagal in an attempt to recoup money Nasso allegedly lost. Gambino family captain Anthony Ciccone first visited Seagal in Toronto during the filming of Exit Wounds in October 2000. In January 2001, Primo Cassarino and other gangsters picked up Seagal by car to bring him to a meeting with Ciccone at a Brooklyn restaurant. At the meeting, Ciccone bluntly told Seagal that he had a choice of making four promised movies with Nasso or paying Nasso a penalty of $150,000 per movie. If Seagal refused, Ciccone would kill him. Seagal, who later claimed that he brought a handgun to the meeting, was able to stall Ciccone and escape the meeting unharmed. Ciccone and Cassarino again visited Seagal at his home in Los Angeles the following month. In the spring of 2001, Seagal sought out another mobster, Genovese crime family captain Angelo Prisco, to act a "peacemaker". He visited Prisco in prison at Rahway, New Jersey, and paid Prisco's lawyer $10,000.

On March 17, 2003, Cassarino, Ciccone and others were convicted of labor racketeering, extortion, and 63 other counts under the Racketeer Influenced and Corrupt Organizations Act. Seagal testified for the prosecution about the mobsters' extortion attempt. Nasso pleaded guilty to the charge of extortion conspiracy in August 2003 and, in February 2004, was sentenced to a year and a day in prison, fined $75,000 and ordered to take mental health counselling on release from jail. He had been described by prosecutors as a mob associate.

Nasso agreed to drop a $60 million lawsuit against Seagal for an alleged breach of contract when the two settled out of court in January 2008.

Filmography
 Marked for Death (1990)....Associate Producer
 Out for Justice (1991)....Executive Producer
 On Deadly Ground (1994)....Producer
 Under Siege 2: Dark Territory (1995)....Co-Producer
 The Glimmer Man (1996)....Producer
 Fire Down Below (1997)....Producer
 Not Even the Trees (1998)....Producer
 The Patriot (1998)....Producer
 Prince of Central Park (2000).....Producer
 One Eyed King (2001)....Producer
 Narc (2002)....Producer
 In Enemy Hands (2004)....Producer
 The Poet (2007)......Executive Producer
 Trophy Wife (2010).....Producer
 Sing Your Song (2011).....Producer
 Squatters (2013).....Producer
 Nailed (2013).....Executive Producer
 Split Decision (2013).....Executive Producer
 Pride of Lions (2013).....Executive Producer
 Getaway (2013).....Executive Producer
 The Legend of William Tell: 3D (2014).....Producer
 Darc  (2019).....Producer and Director
 Record-breaking concert experience for Andrea Bocelli at the Asian Culture Carnival  (2019).....Producer and Director

Awards and nominations
Nasso has earned numerous critical honors, including the 2012 NAACP Image Award for Outstanding Documentary for his work with Harry Belafonte on Sing Your Song (2011).

References

Living people
1952 births
American film producers
University of Connecticut alumni
St. John's University (New York City) alumni
Italian emigrants to the United States
Criminals from Staten Island
Gambino crime family
American extortionists